The Atlantic Wall was an extensive system of coastal defences and fortifications built by Nazi Germany between 1942 and 1944 along the coast of continental Europe and Scandinavia as a defence against an anticipated Allied invasion of Nazi-occupied Europe from the United Kingdom, during World War II.  The manning and operation of the Atlantic Wall was administratively overseen by the German Army, with some support from Luftwaffe ground forces.  The Kriegsmarine (German Navy) maintained a separate coastal defence network, organised into a number of sea defence zones.

Hitler ordered the construction of the fortifications in 1942 through his Führer Directive No. 40. More than half a million French workers were drafted to build it. The wall was frequently mentioned in Nazi propaganda, where its size and strength were usually exaggerated. The fortifications included colossal coastal guns, batteries, mortars, and artillery, and thousands of German troops were stationed in its defences. Today, ruins of the wall exist in all of the nations where it was built, although many structures have fallen into the ocean or have been demolished over the years.

Background

World War II in Europe began on 1 September 1939, with Nazi Germany's invasion of Poland. Two days later, the UK and France declared war on Germany. Poland's geographical location, however, prevented the Allies from intervening directly. Four weeks into the attack, the Germans had successfully occupied Poland.
Less than a month after this victory, Adolf Hitler issued a directive stating that Germany must be ready for an offensive through France and the Low Countries. However, the Oberkommando der Wehrmacht (German high command; OKW) was convinced that preparations would take at least until the following year. After furious arguments, Hitler reluctantly agreed to wait. In May 1940, three massive German army groups overran France and the Low Countries in little more than six weeks.

History

Creation

Prior to the Atlantic Wall decision, following a number of commando raids, on 2 June 1941 Adolf Hitler asked for maps of the Channel Islands. These were provided the next day and by 13 June 1941 Hitler had made a decision. Ordering additional men to the Islands and having decided the defences were inadequate, lacking tanks and coastal artillery, the Organisation Todt (OT) was instructed to undertake the building of 200–250 strong points in each of the larger islands. The plan was finalised by the OT and submitted to Hitler. The original defence order was reinforced with a second dated 20 October 1941, following a Fuhrer conference on 18 October to discuss the engineers' assessment of requirements. The permanent fortification of the Channel Islands was to make them into an impregnable fortress to be completed within 14 months. Festungspionierkommandeur XIV was created to command the project of fortifying the Channel Islands.

It was six months later on 23 March 1942 that Hitler issued Führer Directive No. 40, which called for the creation of an "Atlantic Wall". He ordered naval and submarine bases to be heavily defended. Fortifications remained concentrated around ports until late in 1943, when defences were increased in other areas. This decision required the army engineers and the OT to organise quickly. Massive supplies of cement, steel reinforcing and armour plate would be required and everything would need to be transported.

Nazi propaganda claimed that the wall stretched from the cape of Norway down to the Spanish border.

Regelbau

The Regelbau (standard build) system used books of plans for each of over 600 approved types of bunker and casemate, each having a specific purpose, having been updated as enemy constructions were overrun and examined, even testing some to destruction for effectiveness. They incorporated standard features, such as an entrance door at right angles, armoured air intake,  steel doors, ventilation and telephones, internal walls lined with wood, and an emergency exit system. There were over 200 standardised armour parts.

The standardisation greatly simplified the manufacture of equipment, the supply of materials and the budgetary and financial control of the construction as well as the speed of planning for construction projects.

To offset shortages, captured equipment from the French and other occupied countries armies were incorporated in the defences, casemates designed for non-German artillery, anti tank and machine guns and the use of turrets from obsolete tanks in tobrukstand pill boxes (tobruk pits).

Organisation Todt

Organisation Todt (OT), formed in 1933, had designed the Siegfried Line during the prewar years along the Franco-German border. OT was the chief engineering group responsible for the design and construction of the wall's major gun emplacements and fortifications.

The OT supplied supervisors and labour as well as organising supplies, machinery and transport to supplement the staff and equipment of construction companies. Many of them were German, however construction companies in occupied counties bid for contracts. Companies could apply for OT work or could be conscripted. Companies failing to complete their work on time, which was always possible as the OT controlled the material and manpower of each firm, could find themselves closed down, or more likely fined, or taken over or merged with another firm to make a more efficient larger unit. Successful firms however could make attractive profits.

The OT obtained quotes for necessary works and signed contracts with each construction company setting out the price and terms of the contract, such as bonus payments for efficiency, including the wage rates and bonus payments for OT workers (which depended on their nationality and skill). There could be several construction companies working on each site.

Labour comprised skilled volunteers, engineers, designers and supervisors, who were paid and treated well.  Second came volunteer workers, often skilled technicians, such as carpenters, plumbers, electricians and metal workers.  Again, these workers were paid, took holidays and were well treated. Next came unskilled forced labour, paid very little and treated quite harshly.  Lastly came effective slave labour, paid little, badly fed and treated very harshly. The OT ran training courses to improve labour skills.

Massive numbers of workers were needed.  The Vichy regime imposed a compulsory labour system, drafting some 600,000 French workers to construct these permanent fortifications along the Dutch, Belgian, and French coasts facing the English Channel. Efficiency of the OT decreased in late 1943 and 1944 as a result of manpower pressures, fuel shortages and the bombing of worksites, such as V-weapons sites, where some volunteer workers refused to work in such dangerous areas.

OT Cherbourg in January 1944 dealt with 34 companies with 15,000 workers and 79 sub contractors. Daily, weekly and monthly reports showing progress, work variations, material used, stocks of material, labour hours used per skill type, the weather, equipment inventory and quality, level of supervision, employee absences, staffing levels, deaths and problems experienced all had to be filed with the OT.

British attacks
Throughout most of 1942–43, the Atlantic Wall remained a relaxed front for the Axis troops manning it, with only two large-scale British attacks. Operation Chariot, launched near St Nazaire in March 1942, successfully destroyed German pumping machinery for, and severely damaged, the Normandy dry dock and installations. The second attack was the Dieppe Raid, launched near the French port of Dieppe in August 1942 to test the German defences and provide combat experience for Canadian troops. The Germans were defeated at St. Nazaire, but had little difficulty in repulsing the attack at Dieppe, where they inflicted heavy casualties.  Although the Dieppe raid was a disaster for the Allies, it alarmed Hitler, who was sure an Allied invasion in the West would shortly follow. Following Dieppe, Hitler gave Field Marshal Gerd von Rundstedt, the overall German Commander-in-Chief in the West, 15 further divisions to shore up the German positions.

Reorganisation

Early in 1944, with an Allied invasion of Nazi-occupied Europe becoming ever more likely, Field Marshal Erwin Rommel was assigned to improve the wall's defences. Believing the existing coastal fortifications to be entirely inadequate, he immediately began strengthening them. Rommel's main concern was Allied air power. He had seen it first-hand when fighting the British and Americans in North Africa, and it had left a profound impression on him. He feared that any German counterattack would be broken up by Allied aircraft long before it could make a difference. Under his direction, hundreds of reinforced concrete pillboxes were built on the beaches, or sometimes slightly inland, to house machine guns, antitank guns, and light and heavy artillery. Land mines and antitank obstacles were planted on the beaches, and underwater obstacles and naval mines were placed in waters just offshore. Little known was that touch sensitive mines were placed atop the beach obstacles.  The intent was to destroy the Allied landing craft before they could unload on the beaches.

D-Day

By the time of the Allied invasion, the Germans had laid almost six million mines in Northern France. More gun emplacements and minefields extended inland along roads leading away from the beaches. In likely landing spots for gliders and parachutists, the Germans emplanted slanted poles with sharpened tops, which the troops called Rommelspargel ("Rommel's Asparagus"). Low-lying river and estuarine areas were intentionally flooded. Rommel believed that Germany would inevitably be defeated unless the invasion could be stopped on the beach, declaring, "It is absolutely necessary that we push the British and Americans back from the beaches. Afterwards it will be too late; the first 24 hours of the invasion will be decisive."

Channel Islands

The Channel Islands were heavily fortified, particularly the island of Alderney, which is closest to Britain. Hitler had decreed that one-twelfth of the steel and concrete used in the Atlantic Wall should go to the Channel Islands, because of the propaganda value of controlling British territory. The islands were some of the most densely fortified areas in Europe, with a host of Hohlgangsanlage tunnels, casemates, and coastal artillery positions.

However, as the Channel Islands lacked strategic significance, the Allies bypassed them when they invaded Normandy. As a result, the German garrisons stationed on the islands did not surrender until 9 May 1945—one day after Victory in Europe Day. The garrison on Alderney did not surrender until 16 May. Because most of the German garrisons surrendered peacefully, the Channel Islands are host to some of the best-preserved Atlantic Wall sites.

The commander in Guernsey produced books giving detailed pictures, plans and descriptions of the fortifications in the island, Festung Guernsey.

Fortresses

Many major ports and positions were incorporated into the Atlantic Wall, receiving heavy fortifications. Hitler ordered all positions to fight to the end, and some of them remained in German hands until Germany's unconditional surrender. Several of the port fortresses were resupplied by submarines after being surrounded by Allied Forces. The defenders of these positions included foreign volunteers and Waffen-SS troops.

Preservation

France
Many French construction companies benefited financially from helping construct the Atlantic Wall; these companies were not penalised during the post war period.

Immediately after the war, there was little interest in preserving the wall due to the negative memories associated with the Nazi occupation. Some of the beach fortifications have toppled or are underwater, while those further inland still exist mainly due to their location.

One of the best preserved parts is the Todt Battery. In 2011, renewed efforts to preserve the wall were spearheaded by organisations in Germany, the Netherlands, and the United Kingdom. The question has been raised over whether France should declare the wall a National Monument to ensure it is preserved; however no government so far has envisaged this.

Elsewhere

Although the defensive wall was never fully completed, many bunkers still exist near Ostend, Channel Islands, Scheveningen, The Hague, Katwijk, Noordwijk, and in Scandinavia (Denmark and Norway specifically).

See also
 British anti-invasion preparations of the Second World War
 Czechoslovak border fortifications

Notes

References

Sources

Printed

Online

Media
 
 
 
 The Atlantic Wall and its significance in Allied planning for the D-Day landings are featured in the novel Villa Normandie (Endeavour Press, 2015) by Kevin Doherty.
 The many constructions of the Wall still standing have been photographed by Jonathan Andrew and Stephan Vanfleteren.

External links

 The Atlantikwall at Omaha Beach

 
German World War II defensive lines
World War II sites of Nazi Germany
World War II sites in Belgium
World War II sites in France
World War II sites in the Netherlands
World War II sites in the Channel Islands
Walls
Coastal fortifications
Nazi architecture
Buildings and structures in Alderney
Operation Overlord
German occupation of Jersey during World War II
Wall
Border barriers